Mark Willis may refer to:

Mark Willis (motorcyclist) (born 1976), Australian Grand Prix motorcycle road racer
Mark Willis (politician) (born 1969), American politician, Maine Republican National Committeeman, and challenger to Reince Priebus for RNC Chair

Mark W. Willis, chief executive officer (CEO) of Keller Williams Realty, Inc.
Mark N. Willis (born 1963), member of the South Carolina House of Representatives